Saint-Mars-sur-Colmont (literally Saint-Mars on Colmont) is a commune in the Mayenne department in north-western France. The river Colmont, a tributary of the Mayenne, flows through the commune.

See also
Communes of the Mayenne department

References

Saintmarssurcolmont